Algospongia is a class of small, calcified fossil organisms of uncertain taxonomic position, assigned in a comprehensive 2010 review to "Animalia" incertae sedis (possibly Protista), but both prior to and post that to an unnamed phylum of Algae; other workers simply list them as Problematica (or Microproblematica). They occur in carbonate rocks of the Paleozoic era and their last representatives occur in the Late Permian geological period. Characteristic genera include Aoujgalia, Moravammina and the early-appearing Wetheredella, although the taxonomic validity (and algosponge affinity) of the last named genus has been disputed.

Background and possible taxonomic affinity
Algospongia (vernacular name: algosponges) is a taxon of calcified fossil organisms comprising around 90 accepted genera and several hundred species, treated taxonomically as a single class in an unspecified phylum. Originally considered to be fossil sponges or "pseudo algae", an assignment now refuted, their taxonomic position is somewhat unresolved. Of the three most prominent recent researchers, B. Mamet (Belgium) assigns certain families (e.g. Palaeoberesellaceae, Beresellaceae and Issinellaceae) to Chlorophyta (green algae) as an order of that phylum (Palaeosiphonocladales), at least one other family (Ungdarellaceae) to Rhodophyta (red algae), and some other genera (Groenlandella, Labyrinthoconus) simply to "Microproblematica". Meanwhile, D. Vachard (France) and P. Cózar (Spain) treated Algospongia (such as the family Calcifoliaceae) as Algae incertae sedis, before deciding (in 2010) against any algal affinity and reassigning them to the [zoological] protists, as a group possibly paralleling the Foraminifera. Since that paper, Cózar has continued to use zoological terminology in his published works, while Vachard has once again assigned the group to the Algae incertae sedis, lying hypothetically mid-way between the extant Rhodophyta and Chlorophyta. As at 2021 (although the information cited may date from earlier compilation), the World Foraminifera Database (which forms part of the World Register of Marine Species) lists 18 of the present "algosponge" genera as Foraminifera (Alanyana, Aoujgalia, Baculella, Disonella, Evlania, Fourstonella, Kettnerammina, Litya, Moravammina, Palachemonella/Palaschemonella, Proninella, Saccorhina, Septammina, Stacheia, Stacheoides, Triplosphaerina, Vasicekia and Wetheredella), while the algal portion of WoRMS (imported from AlgaeBase) lists 14 algosponge genera as green algae (Anthracoporellopsis, Asphaltinella, Beresella, Crassikamaena, Cribrokamaena, Dvinella, Eomizzia, Issinella, Jansaella, Kamaena, Kamaenella, Parakamaena, Trinodella and Uraloporella) and 7 as red algae (Amorfia, Cuneiphycus, Donezella, Epistacheoides, Komia, Masloviporidium and Ungdarella), with Metakamaena assigned to "Protozoa", Asphaltina to "Biota incertae sedis", and the remaining genera not yet mentioned. For convenience in the present article, the published summary of Vachard & Cózar (2010) is presented below (with modifications as necessary), which treats the relevant genera as a single class (not split e.g. among different botanical phyla) under zoological nomenclature, however also recognizing that the botanical treatment now preferred by Vachard may in fact be correct, an approach recently adopted in the Interim Register of Marine and Nonmarine Genera (IRMNG) and reflected in the taxon box supplied with this article.

Members of the group occur in the fossil record from the Ordovician to the Late Permian periods, although only Wetheredella is promininent prior to the start of the Devonian. They share a common wall appearance (frequently perforated), possess functional apertures between successive chambers or cells, and appear to have had a sessile or attached mode of life, at depths considered too deep for green algae but possibly overlapping those of red algae, while morphologically they do not exactly resemble members of either of those groups. The most comprehensive recent taxonomic treatment of the group is by Vachard & Cózar, 2010, in which they are treated as a single class divided into 2 orders (Aoujgalida and Moravamminida, corresponding to Aoujgaliales and Moravamminales in botanical nomenclature) typified by the genera Aoujgalia and Moravammina, respectively, plus a number of suborders; this treatment is reproduced below, together with adjustments based on more recent literature of relevance.

Morphology
Algosponges are described as a group of sessile or attached microorganisms with characteristic calcified walls described as "yellowish, apparently granular" that are frequently perforated, and possess either lateral or terminal apertures between successive chambers or cells. The order Aoujgalida (bot.: Aoujgaliales) is characterised by Vachard & Cózar as follows (emended description):

while the order Moravamminida (bot.: Moravamminales) is described as follows (emended description):

Classification
The treatment below is based on that published by Vachard & Cózar in 2010, (alternative, botanical treatment indicated in parentheses); more recent genera (post 2010) and, in some cases, corrections have been added per other available sources. If the group is considered zoological (i.e. non-Algal), nomenclature should follow the provisions of the International Code of Zoological Nomenclature (ICZN); if treated as Algae incertae sedis as per Vachard et al., 2016 and Vachard, 2021, the botanical Code (now International Code of Nomenclature for algae, fungi, and plants or ICNafp) applies.

Kingdom incertae sedis (Animalia or Protista, or Plantae, inferred from Vachard, 2021)
 Phylum incertae sedis ("Algae incertae sedis" in Vachard, 2021)
 Class Algospongia Termier, Termier & Vachard, 1977
 Order Aoujgaliida Termier, Termier & Vachard, 1975 (bot.: Aoujgaliales Termier et al., 1975 ex Vachard & Cózar, 2010)
 Suborder Aoujgaliina G. Termier et al., 1975, nomen translat. Vachard & Cózar, 2010 (bot.: -inae?)
 Family Aoujgaliidae Termier, Termier & Vachard, 1975 (bot.: Aoujgaliaceae Termier, Termier & Vachard, 1975)
 Aoujgalia G. Termier & H. Termier, 1950 (syn.: Mametella Brenkle, 1977)
 Asteroaoujgalia Brenckle, 2004
 Costacheoides Vachard & Cózar, 2010
 Epistacheoides A.A. Petryk & B.L. Mamet, 1972
 Pseudostacheoides A.A. Petryk & B.L. Mamet, 1972
 Roquesselsia Termier, Termier & Vachard, 1977
 Sinustacheoides Termier, Termier & Vachard, 1977
 Stacheoides R.H. Cummings, 1955 (syn.: Chantonia Termier, Termier & Vachard, 1977; Stacheoidella Mamet & Roux in Mamet et al., 1987; Stacheoides Cummings, 1951, nom. nud.)
 Valuzieria Termier, Termier & Vachard, 1977 (listed under accepted name Aoujgalia in Vachard & Cózar, 2010, Table 3, but reinstated as a distinct genus by Vachard et al., 2016
 Family Cuneiphycidae Vachard & Cózar, 2010 (zool. only: no botanical version at this time)
 Cuneiphycus J.H. Johnson, 1960
 Iberiaella L.G. Racz, 1984 (syn.: Contortiporidium Maslov, 1973 - latter name not in Vachard & Cózar, 2010)
 Masloviporidium J.R. Groves & B.L. Mamet in D.F. Toomey & M.H. Nitecki, 1985 (syn.: Pseudodonezella Mamet & Herbig, 1990; latter name incorrectly listed as syn. of Frustulata (Calcifoliidae) in Vachard & Cózar, 2010, Table 3)
 Multiporidium Vachard & Cózar, 2010
 Family Stacheiidae Loeblich & Tappan, 1961 (bot.: Stacheiaceae Loeblich & Tappan, 1961)
 Fourstonella R.H. Cummings, 1955 (syn.: Amorfia L. Rácz, 1964; Chuvashovia Vachard & Montenat, 1981; Eflugelia (sometimes as "Efluegelia") Vachard in Massa & Vachard, 1979; Foliophycopsis Gaillot, 2006; Parastacheia B. Mamet & A. Roux, 1977)
 Stacheia Brady, 1876 (syn.: Conilalia Vachard in Massa & Vachard, 1979)
 Family Ungdarellidae Maslov, 1956 (bot.: Ungdarellaceae Maslov, 1954)
 Cheggatella J. Poncet, 1989
 Cheggatellina B. Mamet & A. Preat, 2013 (latter name not in Vachard & Cózar, 2010)
 Erevanella V.P. Maslov, 1962
 Foliophycus J.H. Johnson, 1960
 Komia K.B. Korde, 1951 (syn.: Pseudokomia L. Rácz, 1964; Turkomia Gaillot, 2006)
 Petschoria K.B. Korde, 1951
 Ungdarella V.P. Maslov, 1956 (syn.: Pseudoungdarella Ivanova, 1999; Suundukella B. Chuvashov & A. Anfimov, 2007; Ungdarelloides B. Chuvashov & A. Anfimov, 2007; Urtasimella B. Chuvashov & A. Anfimov, 2007)
 Ungdarellita Mamet & Villa, 2004
 Suborder Calcifoliina G. Termier et al., 1977 nomen translat. Vachard & Cózar, 2010 (bot.: -inae?)
 Family Calcifoliidae Shuysky in Chuvashov et al., 1987 (bot.: Calcifoliaceae Termier, Termier & Vachard, 1977)
 Calcifolium M.S. Svecov & L.M. Birina, 1935
 Falsocalcifolium D. Vachard & P. Cózar, 2005
 Frustulata V.D. Saltovskaja in M.R. Dzhalolov, 1984
 Family Fasciellidae Shuysky, 1999 (bot.: Fasciellaceae Shuysky, 1999)
 Fasciella R.M. Ivanova, 1973 (syn.: Shartymophycus E.L. Kulik in O.L. Einor, 1973)
 Fascifolium D. Vachard, A. Karim & P. Cózar in Vachard & Cózar, 2010
 Order Moravammida Pokorný, 1951 (bot.: Moravamminales Pokorný, 1951 ex Vachard in Termier et al., 1975); syn.: Palaeosiphonocladales Shuysky, 1985
 Suborder Beresellina Vachard, 1994, nomen. translat. Vachard & Cózar, 2010 (bot.: -inae?)
 Family Beresellidae Maslov & Kulik, 1956 (bot.: Beresellaceae Deloffre, 1988 )
 Ardengostella Vachard in Perret & Vachard, 1977
 Beresella V.N. Makhaev ex V.P. Maslov & E.L. Kulik, 1956
 Dvinella I.V. Khvorova, 1949 (syn.: Eomizzia R. Endô & M. Horiguchi, 1957)
 Trinodella (Maslov & Kulik, 1956) Vachard & Cózar, 2010 (previously a subgenus of Dvinella)
 Uraloporella K.B. Korde, 1950 (syn.: Samarella V.P. Maslov & E.L. Kulik, 1956)
 Suborder Donezellina G. Termier et al., 1975, nomen translat. Vachard & Cózar, 2010 (bot.: -inae?)
 Family Claracrustidae Vachard in Vachard et al., 2001 (bot.: Claracrustaceae Vachard in Vachard et al., 2001)
 Asphaltinella B. Mamet & A. Roux, 1978
 Claracrusta Vachard & Montenat, 1981 (syn.: Berestovia O.I. Berchenko in Y.V. Teslenko, 1982)
 Denisella Vachard & Cózar, 2010
 Kleinbergella B. Mamet & F. Boulvain, 1992
 Peristacheia B. Mamet & A. Roux, 1983
 Pokorninella Vachard in Perret & Vachard, 1977
 Precorninella Vachard, 1991
 Ungdarellina B. Mamet, 2002
 Family Donezellidae Termier, Termier & Vachard, 1975 (bot.: Donezellaceae Termier, Termier & Vachard, 1975)
 Alanyana T. Güvenç, 1967 (listed under accepted name Donezella in Vachard & Cózar, 2010, Table 3, but only as "possible synonym" in text)
 Donezella V.P. Maslov, 1929 ex Vachard in Meissami et al., 1978 (syn.: Goksuella T. Güvenç, 1966)
 Kamaenella B.L. Mamet & A. Roux, 1975
 Praedonezella E.L. Kulik in O.L. Einor, 1973
 Suborder Moravamminina Pokorný, 1951, nomen translat. Vachard & Cózar, 2010 (bot.: -inae?)
 Family Anthracoporellopsidae Shuysky, 1985 (bot.: Anthracoporellopsidacae Shuysky, 1985 ex Vachard in Vachard et al., 1989)
 Anthracoporellopsis V.P. Maslov, 1956
 Brazhnikovia O.I. Berchenko, 1981
 Catenaella V.P. Shuysky, 1987 (as "Catenaenella" (misspelling) in Vachard & Cózar, 2010, Table 3)
 Crassikamaena P.L. Brenckle, 1985
 Culmiella V.P. Shuysky in V.P. Shuysky & D.I. Schirschova in V.N. Dubatolov & T.A. Moskalenko, 1988
 Dokutchaevskella O.I. Berchenko, 1981
 Einoriella V.D. Saltovskaja in M.R. Dzhalolov, 1984 (as "Einorella" (misspelling) in Vachard & Cózar, 2010, Table 3)
 Evlania Bykova, 1952
 Evlaniopsis Vachard & Montenat, 1981
 Groenlandella B.L. Mamet & L. Stemmerik, 2000
 Pseudonanopora B.L. Mamet & A. Roux, 1975
 Family Issinellidae Deloffre, 1987 (bot.: Issinellaceae Deloffre, 1987)
 Amarellina B. Mamet, 1995
 Calcicaulis V.P. Shuysky & D.I. Schirschova in V.P. Shuysky, 1987
 Dreesenulella Vachard, 1991 (syn.: Baculella Conil & Dreesen in Dreesen et al., 1985) note: synonymy reversed from that given in Vachard & Cózar, 2010, per Vachard et al., 2016
 Eouraloporella O.I. Berchenko, 1981
 Issinella E.A. Reitlinger, 1954
 Issinellina V.P. Shuysky in V.P. Shuysky & D.I. Schirschova in V.N. Dubatolov & T.A. Moskalenko, 1988
 Jansaella B.L. Mamet & A. Roux, 1975
 Lemosquetella B. Mamet & A. Sebbar, 1998
 Luteotubulus Vachard in Vachard et al., 1977
 Serrisinella Vachard, 1991
 Tubus B.I. Tchuvashov, 1985
 Zidella V.D. Saltovskaja in M.R. Dzhalolov, 1984
 Family Labyrinthoconidae Langer, 1979 (bot.: Labyrinthoconaceae Langer, 1979)
 Labyrinthoconus W. Langer, 1979
 Proninella Reitlinger in Menner & Reitlinger, 1971 (syn.: Eifeliflabellum W. Langer, 1979)
 Family Moravamminidae Pokorný, 1951 (bot.: Moravamminaceae Pokorný, 1951)
 Kettnerammina Pokorný, 1951 (syn.: Saccorhina Bykova in Bykova & Polenova, 1955)
 Moravammina Pokorný, 1951 (syn.: Litya Bykova in Bykova & Polenova, 1955)
 Palachemonella H. Beckmann, 1953 (misspelling: Palaschemonella H. Beckmann, 1953)
 Pseudoissinella B.L. Mamet & B. Rudloff, 1972 (listed under accepted name Kettnerammina in Vachard & Cózar, 2010, Table 3, but only as "possible synonym" in text)
 Triangulinella B. Mamet & A. Préat, 1985
 Vasicekia Pokorný, 1951 (syn.: Parmacaulis V.P. Shuysky & D.I. Schirschova in V.P. Shuysky, 1987)
 Family Palaeoberesellidae Mamet & Roux, 1974 (bot.: Palaeoberesellaceae Mamet & Roux, 1974)
 Devonoscalae Langer, 1979 (misspelled ("Devonoscala") in Vachard & Cózar, 2010; syn: Stylaella O.I. Berchenko, 1981)
 Exvotarisella G.F. Elliott, 1970
 Kamaena I.A. Antropov in A.P. Jousé, 1967 (syn.: Subkamaena O.I. Berchenko, 1981)
 Kamaenina B. Mamet & A. Preat, 2013 (latter name not in Vachard & Cózar, 2010)
 Kulikaella O.I. Berchenko, 1981
 Metakamaena R. Endô in Kobayashi & Toriyama, 1969
 Palaeoberesella B.L. Mamet & A. Roux, 1975 (syn.: Septammina Meunier, 1888)
 Parakamaena B.L. Mamet & A. Roux, 1975
 Pseudokamaena B.L. Mamet in A.A. Petryk & B.L. Mamet, 1972
 Turgajella R.M. Ivanova in Bogush et al., 1990 (variant spelling: Turgaella R.M. Ivanova in Bogush et al., 1990)
 Wapitella B. Mamet & A. Preat, 2013 (latter name not in Vachard & Cózar, 2010)
 Family Uralitidae Vachard, 1991 (zool. only: no botanical version at this time)
 Cribrokamaena P.L. Brenckle, 1985
 Uralites B.I. Tchuvashov, 1973
 Suborder Wetheredellina a Vachard in Dil et al., 1977, nomen translat. Vachard & Cózar, 2010 (bot.: -inae?)
 Family Asphaltinidae Vachard & Cózar, 2010 (zool. only: no botanical version at this time)
 Asphaltina B.L. Mamet in A.A. Petryk & B.L. Mamet, 1972
 Asphaltinoides J.A. Devera, 1987 (syn.: Cuzbassia R.M. Ivanova in I.O. Bogush, R.M. Ivanova & V.A. Luchinina, 1990)
 Permocatena D. Vachard & P. Miconnet, 1990
 Family Wetheredellidae Vachard in Dil et al., 1976 (bot.: Wetheredellaceae Berchenko in Chuvashov et al., 1987)
 Disonella Conil & Lys, 1964 (syn.: Triplosphaerina Edgell, 2004)
 Sphaeroporella I.A. Antropov in A.P. Jousé, 1967
 Wetheredella Wood, 1948 (syn.: Catena V.P. Maslov, 1956; Cateniphycus V.P. Maslov in J.A. Orlov, 1963; Catena Maslov not listed in Vachard & Cózar, 2010)

Geological occurrence and biostratigraphic value
The stratigraphic range of selected algosponge genera is summarised in Figure 15 of Vachard & Cózar (2010). From this Figure it is apparent that Wetheredella is the sole representative of the group from the Upper Ordovician through the Silurian, being joined by Asphaltinoides a little before the Silurian ends. The majority of other genera then develop within, and/or are restricted to, the Devonian through Carboniferous periods, with a relatively small number (16) persisting through the Permian before all becoming extinct by the end of that period. The same authors also comment (their "Conclusion" no. 4) that "Biostratigraphically, the algospongia can become the most important group in the Tournaisian biostratigraphy with the conodonts, due to the rarity of foraminifera and true dasycladales at least in Europe (western Palaeo-Tethys) and Gondwana."

Phylogeny
Vachard & Cózar (2010) present a suggested phylogeny for algosponge suborders and families in their Figure 17, which shows the Wetheredellina as the basal suborder giving rise to both the Moravamminina and the Donezellina, the Moravamminina then giving rise to the Beressellina, and Donezellina to the Aoujgaliina which in turn give rise to the Calcifoliina.

Alternative taxonomic opinions
As mentioned above, members of the claimed single class Algospongia have been assigned to different taxonomic groups over time, with no clear consensus emerging. More recently Wetheredella, treated as the earliest algosponge genus to appear in the fossil record by Vachard & Cózar, has been re-interpreted as the same as (and therefore junior synonym) of the incertae sedis taxon Allonema (and thus, presumably, not an algosponge) by Jarochowska & Munnecke (2014), a proposal that has been admitted as "possible" by subsequent workers e.g. Liu et al., 2016.

Notes

References 

Plant divisions
Incertae sedis